Arlington Heights High School (AHHS, Heights) is a secondary school located in Fort Worth, Texas, United States. The school, which serves grades 9 through 12, is a part of the Fort Worth Independent School District. Its mascot is the Yellow Jacket and its colors are blue and gold.

Arlington Heights High School serves western portions of Fort Worth including the Como, Arlington Heights, Ridglea, Meadows West, and Rivercrest neighborhoods, and the City of Westover Hills. As of 1996 some students were bussed in from the Butler subsidized housing in Downtown Fort Worth and some communities in southeast Fort Worth with racial and ethnic minority groups.

Hollace Weiner of the Fort Worth Star-Telegram said in 1996 that the school was a "scholastically touted institution that draws students from private schools."

History 

Arlington Heights High School was established in 1922 and hosted 715 students in its inaugural year. The current building was built in 1937 to a design by Preston Geren Sr. Originally, students from this area attended Stripling High School in the 1920s, which is now a feeder middle school.

Arlington Heights was generally affluent and white until the late 1960s. African American students attended Como High School, which no longer exists and was merged with Arlington Heights at its closing. Students at Arlington Heights refer to their school as "The Hill", as the main building offers a view of the Trinity River valley to the south, from which AHHS is visible.

In 1968 Western Hills High School was initially hosted in temporary buildings at Arlington Heights, until its campus opened in 1969. on the 25-acre tract in West Fort Worth at 3600 Boston Avenue.

Notable incidents
In 1979, a Paschal High School student (and son of a county Commissioner) stole a bulldozer from a County construction site, drove it up Hulen Street and rammed it into the Arlington Heights High School Field House the day before the annual Heights-Paschal football game,  destroying the field house. This resulted in criminal convictions and a nationwide reassessment of safety and security measures, as well as beginning a national discussion about youth violence and vandalism on many national television and radio programs. 

In 1963, a number of Paschal students attacked a crowd of Arlington Heights students, using blunt weapons, Molotov cocktails, and a single plane fly-over, which dropped toilet paper with Paschal's school colors.

Description 
The school occupies a red brick building that is visible from Interstate 30 (West Freeway).

The main building houses 74 classrooms, a library, band hall, auditorium, gymnasium, cafeteria, workrooms and administrative offices. Outside buildings include a second gymnasium, field houses with concessions stands, and a weight room. The new wing opened in the fall of 2004 and houses six classrooms and a-state of-the-art dance studio. The surrounding grounds are covered with tennis courts, baseball, softball, a unique multi-purpose athletic facility, soccer and football fields, and an all-weather track which is open to public use.

Student body
In 2014, approximately 1,800 students attended the school. 46% were Hispanic, 29% were White Anglo, and 22% were Black. 45% of the students were eligible for free or reduced lunch.

Arlington Heights' student-athletes compete in the UIL 5A classification for 12 varsity sports.

Notable alumni
 Michael A. Andrews, United States Representative from Texas (1983–1995)
 Leon Bridges, Singer
 Blake Brockermeyer, former NFL player for the Carolina Panthers, Chicago Bears, and Denver Broncos, and former Texas Longhorns lineman
 Milton Brown, "father of Western swing" 
 Betty Buckley, Tony Award-winning actress and singer
 Tim Curry, Tarrant County District Attorney, 1972–2009
 T. Cullen Davis, son of oil tycoon Stinky Davis; accused and acquitted twice for murder at his mansion
 John Denver, folk rock musician
 Willie Flores, United States Coast Guard Medal recipient
 Tony Franklin, former placekicker for the Philadelphia Eagles, New England Patriots, and Miami Dolphins
 Pete Geren, United States Representative from Texas (1989–1997) and Secretary of the Army (2007–2009)
 Preston Geren Jr., architect
 Turner Gill, head football coach at Liberty University; former head football coach for the Kansas Jayhawks; former National Champion Nebraska Cornhuskers quarterback
 Robert Allen Hale, criminal and self-proclaimed pilgrim of the Alaskan wilderness
 Gunilla Hutton, cast member on Hee Haw and Petticoat Junction
 Martha Hyer, actress nominated for an Academy Award for Best Supporting Actress
 Joe K. Longley, former President of the Texas State Bar
 Delbert McClinton, Grammy Award-winning singer-songwriter and musician
 Ronnie Mills, former swimmer; won gold and bronze medals at the age of 17 at the 1968 Summer Olympics
 Lee Harvey Oswald, assassin of President John F. Kennedy (did not graduate)
 Bill Paxton, actor and film director
 Mike Renfro, former NFL player for the Houston Oilers and Dallas Cowboys; college player at TCU
 Sergio Reyes, former U.S. Olympic boxer
 Chuck Reynolds, football player
 Dusty Rhodes, Hall of Fame professional wrestler, known as "The American Dream" 
 A'Shawn Robinson, All-American football player, University of Alabama; former defensive tackle for the Detroit Lions, currently for the Los Angeles Rams
 Tom Schieffer, former U.S. Ambassador to Australia and Japan; candidate for Democratic nomination for governor of Texas
 Tommy Thompson, author
 Marc Veasey, Congressman
 William Walker, Metropolitan Opera baritone
 Van Williams, actor, The Green Hornet

Feeder patterns 

Students attending the following feeder schools are zoned to attend Arlington Heights High School:

Elementary schools 
 Burton Hill
 Como
 M.L. Phillips
 North Hi Mount
 Ridglea Hills
 South Hi Mount

Middle schools 
 W.C. Stripling
 William Monnig

Rivalries 
 R. L. Paschal High School, Fort Worth (listed by Texas Football Monthly as the oldest ongoing high school rivalry in Texas history)
 Trimble Tech High School
 Western Hills High School

References

External links 

 Arlington Heights High School

Educational institutions established in 1922
1922 establishments in Texas
Public high schools in Fort Worth, Texas
Fort Worth Independent School District high schools